A barista (from the Italian/Spanish for "bartender") is a person, usually a coffeehouse employee, who prepares and serves espresso-based coffee drinks.

Etymology and inflection
The word barista comes from Italian and Spanish where it means a male or female "bartender" who typically works behind a counter, serving hot drinks (such as espresso), cold alcoholic and non-alcoholic beverages, and snacks. Prieto (2021) shows that the word barista has been documented since 1916 in both Spanish and Italian. The native plural in English and Spanish is baristas, while in Italian the plural is baristi for masculine (literally meaning "barmen", "bartenders") or bariste for feminine (literally meaning "barmaids").

Application of the title

While the title is not regulated, most coffee shops use the title to describe the preparer of coffee and operator of an espresso machine.

Baristas generally operate a commercial espresso machine, and their role is preparing and pulling the shot; the degree to which this is automated or done manually varies significantly, ranging from push-button operation to an involved manual process. Espresso is a notoriously finicky beverage, and good manual espresso making is considered a skilled task. Further, preparation of other beverages, particularly milk-based drinks such as cappuccinos and lattes, but also non-espresso coffee such as drip or press pot, requires additional work and skill for effective frothing, pouring and most often latte art. In Starbucks, over the counter employees are referred to as "baristas", although the preparation process is fully automated.

The barista usually has been trained to operate the machine and to prepare the coffee based on the guidelines of the roaster or shop owner, while more experienced baristas may have discretion to vary preparation or experiment.
To make the coffee well, there is a series of steps needing attention, including grinding the beans, extracting the coffee, frothing the milk and pouring.

Beyond the preparation of espresso and other beverages and general customer service, skilled baristas acquire knowledge of the entire process of coffee to effectively prepare a desired cup of coffee, including maintenance and programming of the machine, grinding methods, roasting, and coffee plant cultivation, similar to how a sommelier is familiar with the entire process of wine making and consumption. A barista can acquire these skills by attending training classes, but they are more commonly learned on the job.
There are a lot of myths and misinformation about coffee varieties. Every type of coffee holds many different characteristics when it comes to flavor, acidity, caffeine content, and more. A frequent misconception about coffee is that the darker the roast, the more caffeine, or the “stronger” it is. This, however, is not at all true. Although every variety of coffee has different levels of caffeine, if you were to roast one single variety as a light roast, a medium roast, and a dark roast, the lighter roast will always have more caffeine. This is because as the coffee beans get exposed to more heat and higher temperatures, more caffeine molecules burn off or combust and therefore deteriorate. Although it is often not a substantial difference, lightly roasted coffee generally contains more caffeine. Another misconception about light roast coffee is that it does not have as bold of a flavor. This could not be further from the truth, many light roast coffees can have very bold, in-depth, and unique flavor profiles, as do medium or dark roasts. Each coffee variety can be roasted to any temperature but will taste best in a specific range. Some coffee varieties taste best as a lighter roast, some taste best as a medium, and some taste best as dark as they can get. There are also many ranges between light and medium, and medium and dark, that coffee specialists can dial into and procure perfect, delicious results with.

Competition
Formal barista competitions originated in Norway, and one such is the World Barista Championships, held annually at varied international locations. Baristas worldwide compete, though they must first compete in a competition held in their own country to qualify to enter in the WBC, such as the United States Barista Championship.

See also
 Bikini barista
 Barista (film)
 Milkman
 Soda jerk
 Sommelier
 
 Cafe latte

References 

Coffee culture
Hospitality occupations
Food services occupations
 
Coffee in Italy